Cyrtandra elegans is a species of flowering plants in the family Gesneriaceae. It is found on the island of New Guinea.

References

External links 
 

elegans
Plants described in 1923
Flora of Western New Guinea
Flora of Papua New Guinea